Ponteland Castle is a 13th-century stone tower house just off the A696 road in Ponteland, 8 miles north-west of Newcastle upon Tyne, in Northumberland. Founded by William de Valence, part of it was destroyed in a Scottish raid in 1388. In the 17th century it became part of a Jacobean manor house. The building is now occupied by the Blackbird Inn, and is rumoured to contain an old tunnel connecting it to St Mary's church across the road. The tunnel was supposedly bricked up behind the fireplace in The Tunnel Room.

References

Towers completed in the 13th century
Castles in Northumberland